Under Western Eyes may refer to:

 Under Western Eyes (novel), a 1912 novel by Joseph Conrad
 Under Western Eyes (1936 film), French film based on the novel
 Under Western Eyes (1996 film), Israeli film